Poompuhar College is situated on the bank of River Cauveri at Poompuhar-Melaiyur which is located 5 km away from the Bay of Bengal. Poompuhar was the capital of the great Chola Kingdom, during the ancient time, it was connected with Greece and Rome. The Hindu Religious and Charitable Endowment Admn. Department of the Government of Tamil Nadu established this college in 1964.
 
The college runs as a day college and evening college. The college offers undergraduate courses, post graduate courses and research courses.  Co-education system has been introduced from the academic year 1990–91.

Transport
Poompuhar College is accessible from Mayiladuthurai, Sirkali.  The distance between Mayiladuthurai and Melaiyur is around 20 kilometer as per distancebetween.info.  Mayiladuthurai is the nearest railway junction located around 22 kilometers from college. The nearest National Highway junction KaruVilunthaNagapuram (Karuvi) is located around 4 km from the college.  It has well connected motor road with nearest towns. We can reach the college by corporation buses and private buses.

References

Education in Mayiladuthurai district
Educational institutions established in 1964
1964 establishments in Madras State
Colleges affiliated to Bharathidasan University